Tommy Morrison vs. Michael Bentt, billed as "The Tulsa Shootout", was a professional boxing match contested on October 29, 1993 for the WBO Heavyweight Championship.

Background
On October 18, 1991, the then-undefeated Tommy Morrison lost to Ray Mercer via 5th-round knockout in his first attempt at capturing the WBO heavyweight title. Following his loss, Morrison strung together eight consecutive victories before landing another shot at the vacant WBO title against popular 44-year-old former heavyweight champion George Foreman. Through the course of the fight, Morrison abandoned his aggressive style and used constant movement to keep Foreman off balance. Though the pro-Foreman crowd booed Morrison for using the tactic, it nevertheless paid off as Morrison was able to pick up a lopsided unanimous decision, winning by two scores of 117–110 and one score of 118–109, becoming the new WBO heavyweight champion in the process. Originally, Morrison's first defense was scheduled to be against his Rocky V co-star Mike Williams, but Williams pulled out only an hour before the fight after refusing to take a pre-fight drug test. As such, Morrison proceeded to defeat unknown journeyman Tim Tomashek in what would ultimately become a non-title bout after the WBO refused to sanction the fight. A month prior, Morrison had reached an agreement to face the undefeated Lennox Lewis for Lewis' WBC heavyweight title. However, before moving on to face Lewis, Morrison chose to first defend his WBO title against the virtually unknown Michael Bentt, who was a highly decorated amateur, but had only 11 fights in five years as a professional. Bentt went on to fight Morrison reportedly not fully recovered from the arm fracture.

The Fight
Morrison was able to quickly get Bentt's back up against the ropes and staggered him twice with left hooks. Morrison would hit Bentt with a multiple-punch combination, but soon tired, allowing Bentt to counter with a combination of his own that sent Morrison down to the canvas only 50 seconds into the round. Morrison was able to answer the referee's count, but Bentt quickly attacked him with another powerful combination that sent Morrison into the ropes and back onto the canvas only seconds after the first knockdown. With Morrison clearly shaken up from the knockdowns and the three knockdown rule in effect, Bentt relentlessly continued to hammer Morrison with another powerful combination in an effort to get the deciding knockdown. After backing Morrison into the ropes, Bentt landed a six-punch combination that again sent Morrison down. The fight was immediately stopped and Bentt was named the winner by technical knockout at 1:33 of the first round, becoming the new WBO Heavyweight Champion.

Aftermath
Morrison's loss not only cost him the WBO title, but also his planned $8 million WBC title fight with Lennox Lewis. Morrison would go undefeated in his next eight fights, which concluded with a knockout of former number one contender Donovan "Razor" Ruddock that got him back into contention. After a WBO heavyweight title match with Riddick Bowe fell through, he finally met Lewis in a non-title bout on October 7, 1995, ultimately losing by sixth round knockout.

Bentt, meanwhile, would make the first defense of his title on March 19, 1994 against British fighter Herbie Hide. Bentt was knocked out in the seventh round and had to be rushed to the hospital where he spent four days in a medically induced coma after suffering brain damage. Though he eventually made a full recovery, the injuries were severe enough that Bentt was forced to retire shortly after.

Broadcasting

References

World Boxing Organization heavyweight championship matches
Boxing matches
Boxing on HBO
1993 in boxing
Boxing in Oklahoma
Sports in Tulsa, Oklahoma
1993 in sports in Oklahoma
October 1993 sports events in the United States